Orbus is a 2009 science fiction novel by Neal Asher.  It is the third novel in the Spatterjay sequence.

2009 British novels
British science fiction novels
2009 science fiction novels
Tor Books books